The 19th U-boat Flotilla (German 19. Unterseebootsflottille) was a unit of Nazi Germany's Kriegsmarine during World War II.

It was founded in October 1943 as a Training Flotilla (Ger. Ausbildungsflottille) where future commanders received their basic training (Kommandanten-Vorschule), under the command of Korvettenkapitän Jost Metzler. Originally based at Pillau, it relocated to Kiel in February 1945. It was disbanded in May 1945 when Germany surrendered.

Assigned U-boats
Four U-boats were assigned to this flotilla during its service.

References 

19
Military units and formations of the Kriegsmarine
Military units and formations established in 1943
Military units and formations disestablished in 1945